Emmanuel Cummings was a mayor of Freetown, Sierra Leone, and was the father of Eustace Henry Taylor Cummings, who later became a mayor of Freetown.

References
Profile of Eustace Henry Taylor Cummings

19th-century births
Year of death missing
Mayors of Freetown
Sierra Leone Creole people